Muang Mao, also spelled Möng Mao or the Mao Kingdom was an ethnic Tai state that controlled several smaller Tai states or chieftainships along the frontier of what is now Myanmar, China, the states of Northeast India of Assam, and Arunachal Pradesh, principally set in the Dehong region of Yunnan with a capital near the modern-day border town of Ruili/Meng Mao. The name of the main river in this region is the Nam Mao, also known as the Shweli River.

Names
Möng Mao is Tai Nuea and Shan language name, also called Möng Mao Lông, which means "Great Muang Mao". The "Möng" means country or place. The "Mao" (ᥛᥣᥝᥰ) was evolved from "dizzy" (ᥛᥝᥰ), it is because the mother of legendary king Chao U Ting felt dizzy when she was brought to the sky by a bird. The name "Möng Mao" is still used nowadays, as the official Tai Nuea name of Ruili City (ᥝᥥᥒᥰ ᥛᥫᥒᥰ ᥛᥣᥝᥰ) and in the Burmese Mongmao Township (Wa: mēng hmae;).

Kosambi was an Indian ancient country, Mong Mao used Kosambi as his Buddhistic classical name."Kosambi" is also called "Guo-zhan-bi" in Ruili, modern Dai people give a new explanation of "Guo-zhan-bi" which is "place that produce fragrant soft rice".

In Chinese literature, Möng Mao was called Luchuan, first recorded in Yuanshi as the name of the administrative division "Luchuan Circuit". Some of literature also called Mong Mao as Baiyi, but most of the time this is a collective name of all the ethnic groups in south west of Yunnan, or specifically refers to Dai people.

In Burmese literature, Möng Mao was called Maw or Maw Shan. In the Manipur literature, such as Cheitharol Kumbaba use the name Pong refer to Mong Mao.

History
The chronicle of this region, titled the Möng Mao Chronicle, was written much later. Some scholars identify Möng Mao with the Kingdom of Pong, as well as with the kingdom of Luh Shwan mentioned in Chinese chronicles. Like most of Tai Yai history, the history of the Kingdom of Pong is largely legendary and existing chronicles and traditions include conflicting names and dates which have led to different interpretations.

Möng Mao arose in the power vacuum left after the Kingdom of Dali in Yunnan fell to the Mongol Yuan Dynasty around 1254. The Yuan ruled the region indirectly in what was known as the Native Chieftain System. This kingdom had asserted some unity over the diversity of ethnic groups residing along the southwest frontier of Yunnan.  

After the Ming conquest of Yunnan the Möng Mao under Si Lunfa decided to submit to Ming authority. However, Möng Mao revolted in 1386 and led to the Ming–Mong Mao War (1386–1388). In 1448, a combination of Ming, Sipsongpanna, and other allied forces subjugated Möng Mao.

"Muang Mao" is sometimes used by authors to refer to the entire group of Tai states along the Chinese-Myanmar frontier including Luchuan-Pingmian (麓川平緬), Muang Yang, and Hsenwi, even though specific place names are almost always used in Ming and Burmese sources.

The center of power shifted frequently between these smaller states or chieftainships. Sometimes they  were unified under one strong leader, sometimes they were not. As the Shan scholar Sai Kam Möng observes: "Sometimes one of these [smaller states] strove to be the leading kingdom and sometimes all of them were unified into one single kingdom..." The capital of the kingdom shifted from place to place, but most of them were located near the Nam Mao river (the "Shweli" on most maps today)" 

The various versions of the Möng Mao Chronicle provide the lineage of Möng Mao rulers. The Shan chronicle tradition, recorded very early by Elias (1876), provides a long list with the first ruler of Möng Mao dating from 568 A.D.  The dates in Elias for later rulers of Möng Mao do not match very well the dates in Ming dynasty sources such as Ming Shilu (Wade, 2005) and Baiyi Zhuan (Wade, 1996) which are considered more reliable from the time of the ruler Si Kefa. Bian-zhang-ga (1990), translated into Thai by Witthayasakphan and Zhao Hongyun (2001), also provides a fairly detailed local chronicle of Möng Mao.

List of Monarchs

Tai Ahom descendants 
Chaolung Sukaphaa was the founder of the Ahom kingdom in what is now parts of Assam. A Tai prince originally from Muang Mao, founded the kingdom in what is now Charaideo region of Assam, in 1228 and existed for nearly six hundred years which led to the process of Ahomisation and in the process unified the various indigenous ethnic groups of the region under the banner of 'Ahom' that left a deep impact on the region. In reverence to his position in Assam's history the honorific Chaolung (Shan: ၸဝ်ႈလူင်) is generally associated with his name (Chao: lord; Lung: great).

Since 1996, December 2nd has been celebrated in Assam as the Sukaphaa Divawkh, or Axom Divawkh (Assam Day), to commemorate the advent of the first king of the Ahom kingdom in Assam after his journey over the Patkai Hills.

Notes

References

Bibliography 
 
 Bian-zhang-ga. (1990). "Hemeng gumeng: Meng Mao gudai zhuwang shi [A History of the Kings of Meng Mao]." In Meng Guozhanbi ji Meng Mao gudai zhuwang shi [History of Kosampi and the kings of Meng Mao]. Gong Xiao Zheng. (tr.) Kunming, Yunnan, Yunnan Minzu Chubanshe.
 Daniels, Christian (2006) "Historical memories of a Chinese adventurer in a Tay chronicle; Usurpation of the throne of a Tay polity in Yunnan, 1573–1584,"  International Journal of Asian Studies, 3, 1 (2006), pp. 21–48.
 Elias, N. (1876) Introductory Sketch of the History of the Shans in Upper Burma and Western Yunnan. Calcutta: Foreign Department Press. (Recent facsimile Reprint by Thai government in Chiang Mai University library).
 

 Jiang Yingliang (1983) Daizu Shi [History of the Dai ethnicity], Chengdu: Sichuan Renmin Chubanshe.
 
 Kam Mong, Sai (2004) The History and Development of the Shan Scripts, Chiang Mai; Silkworm Books.
 Liew, Foon Ming. (1996) "The Luchuan-Pingmian Campaigns (1436–1449): In the Light of Official Chinese Historiography". Oriens Extremus 39/2, pp. 162–203.
 

 

 Wade, Geoff (1996) "The Bai Yi Zhuan: A Chinese Account of Tai Society in the 14th Century," 14th Conference of the International Association of Historians of Asia (IAHA), Chulalongkorn University, Bangkok, Thailand [Includes a complete translation and introduction to the Ming travelogue "Bai-yi Zhuan", a copy can be found at the Thailand Information Center at Chulalongkorn Central Library
 Wade, Geoff. tr. (2005) Southeast Asia in the Ming Shi-lu: an open access resource, Singapore: Asia Research Institute and the Singapore E-Press, National University of Singapore, http://epress.nus.edu.sg/msl/
 Witthayasakphan, Sompong and Zhao Hongyun (translators and editors) (2001) Phongsawadan Muang Tai (Khreua Muang ku muang), Chiang Mai: Silkworm. (Translation of Mong Mao chronicle into the Thai language)

External links 
  Crucible of War: Burma and the Ming in the Tai Frontier Zone (1382–1454), by Jon Fernquest

Former countries in Asia
Former countries in Chinese history
Tai history
Tusi in Yunnan
Shan States